Nakas Onyeka (born September 30, 1995) is a former professional Canadian football linebacker who played for four seasons in the Canadian Football League (CFL). He first played for the Toronto Argonauts for three seasons and was a member of the 105th Grey Cup championship team. He has also been a member of the Saskatchewan Roughriders, Winnipeg Blue Bombers, and Edmonton Elks.

University career
Onyeka played U Sports football with the Wilfrid Laurier Golden Hawks. He was selected as an All-Canadian in his Senior year after leading the Golden Hawks to a Yates Cup. He finished the season with 60 Solo Tackles, 5.5 Sacks and 17.5 Tackles for Loss.

In his college career he was twice named an OUA All-Star as he amassed

Professional career

Arizona Cardinals
Onyeka was invited to Arizona Cardinals mini-camp during the 2017 off-season.

Toronto Argonauts
Onyeka was originally drafted 36th overall in the 2017 CFL Draft by the Toronto Argonauts and signed with the team on May 24, 2017. He made his professional debut on June 25, 2017, against the Hamilton Tiger-Cats. Over three seasons, he played in 36 regular season games, recording 14 defensive tackles, 30 special teams tackles, two quarterback sacks, and one forced fumble. On May 4, 2020, Onyeka was released by the Argonauts.

Saskatchewan Roughriders
On May 19, 2020, Onyeka signed with the Saskatchewan Roughriders. He signed a one-year contract extension with the team on December 22, 2020. He was released on July 20, 2021.

Winnipeg Blue Bombers
On July 24, 2021, it was announced that Onyeka had signed with the Winnipeg Blue Bombers. He played in two games for the team and spent time on the practice roster before being released on October 4, 2021.

Saskatchewan Roughriders (II)
On October 28, 2021, it was announced that Onyeka had re-signed with the Saskatchewan Roughriders.

Edmonton Elks
Onyeka signed with the Edmonton Elks to open free agency on February 8, 2022. However, it was announced that he had retired on March 18, 2022.

Personal life
Onyeka is the cousin of defensive end Kene Onyeka and defensive back Godfrey Onyeka, both of whom also play in the Canadian Football League. He is of Nigerian descent.

References

External links
Saskatchewan Roughriders bio

1994 births
Living people
Canadian football linebackers
Players of Canadian football from Ontario
Wilfrid Laurier Golden Hawks football players
Sportspeople from Brampton
Saskatchewan Roughriders players
Toronto Argonauts players
Canadian sportspeople of Nigerian descent
Winnipeg Blue Bombers players